Unni Marie Anisdahl (born 27 September 1947) is a Norwegian former handball player, and later sports reporter for the Norwegian Broadcasting Corporation. She played 72 matches for the national handball team in the 1970s, including the 1971, 1973 and 1975 World Women's Handball Championships.

References

External links

1947 births
Living people
Norwegian female handball players
Norwegian sports broadcasters
NRK people